Schloss Gleichenberg is a castle in Styria, Austria. Schloss Gleichenberg is situated at a height of 414 meters.

See also
List of castles in Austria

References

This article was initially translated from the German Wikipedia.

Castles in Styria